Pultenaea euchila, commonly known as orange pultenaea, is a species of flowering plant in the family Fabaceae and is endemic to eastern Australia. It is an erect shrub with glabrous foliage, narrow egg-shaped leaves with the narrower end towards the base, and orange-coloured flowers arranged singly or in small groups near the ends of branchlets.

Description
The upper surface of the leaves is paler than the lower side.

Taxonomy and naming
Pultenaea euchila was first formally described in 1825 by Augustin Pyramus de Candolle in his Prodromus Systematis Naturalis Regni Vegetabilis.

Distribution and habitat
Orange pultenaea grows in near-coastal forests from Lake Macquarie in New South Wales to southern Queensland.

References

euchila
Flora of New South Wales
Flora of Queensland
Plants described in 1825
Taxa named by Augustin Pyramus de Candolle